Madge Kennedy (April 19, 1891 – June 9, 1987) was a stage, film and TV actress whose career began as a stage actress in 1912 and flourished in motion pictures during the silent film era. In 1921, journalist Heywood Broun described her as "the best farce actress in New York".

Early years

Kennedy was born in Chicago. Her father was a judge in a criminal court. After she and her family lived in California, she moved to New York City with her mother to paint. She studied two years at the Art Students League, planning to be an illustrator. Luis Mora saw her art work and recommended that she go to Siasconset (in Nantucket, Massachusetts) for a summer.

Career

Theater
The Siasconset colony was evenly divided among actors and artists, and painters often gave theatrical performances.

Kennedy appeared in a skit written by Kenneth and Roy Webb and impressed professional Harry Woodruff, who commented, "She could act rings around anybody." As a result, she was offered the lead opposite Woodruff in The Genius. Soon she was in Cleveland, where Robert McLaughlin gave her work with his stock company.

Kennedy first appeared on Broadway in Little Miss Brown (1912), a farce in three acts presented at the 48th Street Theater. Critics found Kennedy's performance most pleasing, writing, "Miss Kennedy's youth, good looks, and marked sense of fun helped her to make a decidedly favorable impression last night." That same year she appeared in The Point of View.

1914 saw her in the popular Twin Beds, and in 1915 she scored a sensational hit at the Eltinge Theater as Blanny Wheeler opposite John Cumberland in Avery Hopwood's classic farce, Fair and Warmer, which ran 377 performances. Critic Louis Vincent DeFoe wrote, "Madge Kennedy proves anew that consummate art is involved even in farcical acting." In the late Teens she would leave the stage for three years to appear in moving pictures for Samuel Goldwyn (see "Films" below).

Kennedy returned to the New York stage in November 1920, playing in Cornered, staged at the Astor Theatre. Produced by Henry Savage, the play, taken from the writing of Dodson Mitchell, offered Kennedy a dual role.

In 1923, she starred opposite W.C. Fields in Poppy, where she enjoyed top billing. In the comedy, Beware of Widows (1925), which was produced at Maxine Elliott Theatre, a reviewer for The New York Times noted, once again, Kennedy's physical beauty as well as her skill as a comedian.

Later, she starred in Philip Barry's Paris Bound (1927) and in Noël Coward's Private Lives (1931), having succeeded Gertrude Lawrence.

After an absence of 33 years, she returned to Broadway in August 1965, appearing with her good friend Ruth Gordon in Gordon and Kanin's A Very Rich Woman.

Films

In 1917, Sam Goldwyn of Goldwyn Pictures signed Kennedy to a film contract. She starred in 21 five-reel films, such as Baby Mine (1917), Nearly Married (1917), Our Little Wife (1918), The Service Star (1918) and Dollars and Sense (1920).

Kennedy told a reporter in 1916, "I have discovered that one of the best ways to act is to make your mind as vacant as possible." In 1918, Our Little Wife premiered with Kennedy playing the role of Dodo Warren. The story is about a woman whose marriage is both humorous and sad. The screenplay was adapted from a comedy by Avery Hopwood.

A Perfect Lady (1918) was released in December and was taken from a stage play by Channing Pollock and Rennold Wolf. Kennedy co-starred with James Montgomery. In 1923, she starred in The Purple Highway. The screenplay is an adaptation of the stage play Dear Me, written by Luther Reed and Hale Hamilton.

The 1920s were a productive period for Kennedy. Following The Purple Highway, she had prominent roles in Three Miles Out (1924), Scandal Sheet (1925), Bad Company (1925), Lying Wives (1925), Oh, Baby! (1926), and Walls Tell Tales (1928).

She was out of motion pictures until she resumed her career in The Marrying Kind (1952) and Main Street to Broadway (1953).

In the late 1950s, she combined TV work with roles in movies like  The Rains of Ranchipur (1955), The Catered Affair (1956), Lust for Life (1956), Houseboat (1958), A Nice Little Bank That Should Be Robbed (1958), Plunderers of Painted Flats (1959), and North by Northwest (1959). She has an uncredited part as a secretary in the Marilyn Monroe film Let's Make Love (1960).

Her film career endured into the 1970s with roles in They Shoot Horses, Don't They? (1969), The Baby Maker (1970), The Day of the Locust (1975), and Marathon Man (1976).

Radio and television
As a guest on the Red Davis series (1934) over NBC Radio and WJZ (WABC-AM) network, Kennedy worked with Burgess Meredith who had the title role. She was written into the full script by the program's creator, Elaine Sterne Carrington.

Kennedy was prolific in terms of her television appearances beginning with an episode of the Schlitz Playhouse of Stars (1954). Her additional performances in television series are Studio 57 (1954), General Electric Theater (1954), Science Fiction Theater (1955), The Life and Legend of Wyatt Earp (1960), The Best of the Post (1961), Alfred Hitchcock Presents (1956–1961), The Alfred Hitchcock Hour (1962), The Twilight Zone (1963), and CBS Playhouse (1967). She also had a semi-recurring role as Theodore Cleaver's Aunt Martha on the hit family sitcom Leave it to Beaver (1957–63). She played June Cleaver's aunt and the Beaver's great-aunt. Ms. Kennedy also appeared as Mimi (the wife of Albert, Felix's grandfather played by Tony Randall) in The Odd Couple (1972).

Producing
Kennedy and her husband, Harold Bolster (who had been an executive with Goldwyn), formed Kenma Corporation, a film production company. Kenma made The Purple Highway (1923) and Three Miles Out (1924), both of which starred Kennedy but had little success.

Personal life and death

Kennedy's contract with Goldwyn ended in 1921. She decided to return to the stage so that she could be close to her husband, broker Harold Bolster, in New York. Bolster died on August 3, 1927, from an illness he contracted months before during a business trip to South America. He was a member of the New York banking firm of Bennett, Bolster & Coghill. Bolster was 38 and a veteran of World War I. Kennedy inherited more than $500,000 when he died.

She wed William B. Hanley Jr., in Kingman, Arizona, on August 13, 1934. Hanley was an actor and radio personality. The couple resided in Los Angeles, California. Kennedy retired temporarily after her marriage before returning to work in entertainment. The couple would remain married until Hanley's death in 1959.

She enjoyed outdoor activities such as playing golf, horseback riding and driving cars. She owned a Willys-Knight Great Six which she drove avidly at the time she was touring in 1929 in the play, Lulu. In August 1929, she was sued in a Norwich, Connecticut, court for damages she caused in a car accident on the Boston Post Road near Groton, Connecticut, in June 1928. The plaintiffs asked for $13,000.

Madge Kennedy died of respiratory failure at the Motion Picture & Television Country House and Hospital in Woodland Hills, California, in 1987. She was 96.

Recognition 
Kennedy has a star at 1600 Vine Street in the Motion Pictures section of the Hollywood Walk of Fame. It was dedicated on February 8, 1960.

Selected filmography
Silent

Talkies

Television

References

External links

 
 
 
 Madge Kennedy at Virtual History

1891 births
1987 deaths
American film actresses
American silent film actresses
American stage actresses
Vaudeville performers
American television actresses
American radio actresses
Actresses from California
20th-century American actresses